The Spider-Slayers are a series of fictional robots appearing in American comic books published by Marvel Comics. Created by Spencer Smythe, they were designed specifically to hunt down, capture, or kill Spider-Man. A new generation of Spider-Slayers was later created by Spencer's son, Alistair.

The Spider-Slayers have been featured in a number of Spider-Man adaptations outside of comics, including animated series and video games.

Publication history
The Spider-Slayers first appeared in The Amazing Spider-Man #25 (June 1965) and were created by Stan Lee and Steve Ditko.

Fictional character biography
See List of Spider-Slayers for a full breakdown of all versions of the Spider-Slayer.

The first series of robots were originally designed and built by Prof. Spencer Smythe with the financial backing of J. Jonah Jameson, who piloted them for the pleasure of personally hunting the superhero he hated for capture and public unmasking. However, Spider-Man always managed to defeat each robot in turn. Smythe's continual efforts to perfect his machines backfired on him, leading to himself being fatally contaminated by radiation poisoning from the building materials of his creations. Blaming both Jameson and Spider-Man for this, he attempted, as a final act, to murder them both, but died just before Spider-Man thwarted the attempt.

At one point, Jameson commissioned another scientist, Dr. Marla Madison, to create a new and improved Spider-Slayer. While that attempt failed, he eventually fell in love with her and married her.

In The Amazing Spider-Man Annual #19 (1985), Smythe's son, Alistair, emerged as the new builder of the Spider-Slayers. He swore revenge on Spider-Man, repeatedly attacking the superhero with his own series of Slayers. Smythe later mutated into a humanoid Spider-Slayer, but remains a minor foe.

The original Spider-Slayer was seen among the robots and machines in the Reanimator's collection. Wolverine later destroyed the Spider-Slayer when the Reanimator attempted to use it against him. It was later used by J. Jonah Jameson to attack the She-Hulk after she had married his son John, but it was destroyed again.

In The Amazing Spider-Man #603, Jameson (now Mayor of New York) has some old Spider-Slayers sent to him from storage to better equip his "Anti-Spider Squad" to take down Spider-Man. The Spider-Slayer technology is combined with that of the Mandroid suits. However, the "Spider-Slayer Squad" wearing the suits quit their jobs after Spider-Man saves them and New York from a dirty bomb.

Despite not being technically related to the Smythes' and Madison's creations, when Spider-Man refits all the Octobots confiscated from Doctor Octopus and kept in the New York Police Precinct to carry an antidote able to reverse the mutations turning all the New York population into Man-Spiders, he humorously renames them his own Spider-Slayers.

When the Goblin King and his Goblin Underground group cause havoc in Manhattan, Mayor J. Jonah Jameson unveils the Goblin-Slayers which he plans to use against the Goblin-related threats. Mary Jane Watson voices her concern that the Goblin-Slayers used to be former Spider-Slayers. Mayor J. Jonah Jameson orders Chief Pratchett to send one of the Goblin Slayers to the robbery location and then head to chase the Superior Spider-Man (Doctor Octopus' mind in Peter Parker's body). After Don Lamaze sacrifices his life to get out of the Goblin King's trap, the Superior Spider-Man confronted by a legion of Spider-Slayers with Mayor J. Jonah Jameson's face projected on the front faceplate. Mayor J. Jonah Jameson replies that he is done with being blackmailed by him and he does not care if he loses everything as long as he can finally bring down Spider-Man. The Superior Spider-Man tries to fight the Spider-Slayers, but discovers that they are far stronger than all the previous ones. Suddenly, the Spider-Slayers are deactivated remotely by Spider-Man 2099, who confronts the Superior Spider-Man about who he really is and the reasons behind his actions of late. Suddenly, the Spider-Slayers are reactivated, to Spider-Man 2099's shock. The Goblin King's voice rings out, declaring that he has taken control of the Spider-Slayers as well, which grab both Spider-Men by their heads as the Goblin King comments that Norman Osborn now runs this city.

In a Spider-Man 2099 storyline following Smythe's death, dealers illegally sell Spider-Slayers to foreign nations. However, after Miguel accompanies Tiberus Stone on one such deal, he ends up fighting the Scorpion (who was hired by Alchemax to further test the Spider-Slayers) as Stone is captured by the local rebels, Miguel defeating the Scorpion by tricking the Spider-Slayers into attacking him, while Stone's encounter with the rebels prompts him to change his mind about the original deal.

List of Spider-Slayers

Other versions

Ultimate Marvel
The Ultimate Marvel version of Spider-Slayers are eight foot robots that balance on a large sphere, wield two arm-cannons and have a sphere for a head, and built and controlled remotely by the Tinkerer. Created in the event Spider-Man ever went rogue, the Spider-Slayers are deployed by Nick Fury to Peter Parker's residence when clones of Spider-Man begin running rampant, with the Slayers' objective being to arrest Peter Parker. The Slayers encounter the Fantastic Four and Carnage which reverts to Gwen Stacy after the Spider-Slayers take her down. The Spider-Slayers later kill a disfigured clone and imprison another unstable clone in S.H.I.E.L.D.

MC2
While trying to apprehend a dimension-hopping supervillain in the MC2 reality, Spider-Girl is accidentally sent into Earth-616's past, where she encounters the first Spider-Slayer. Mistaking her for its quarry, the Spider-Slayer attacks Spider-Girl who manages to evade the machine due to being distracted by how different "Spider-Man" looks. Spider-Girl later returns to her own universe and time, while Spider-Man defeats the Spider-Slayer in the same way he did in the original story.

House of M
In the House of M reality, J. Jonah Jameson (fearing Peter Parker would take revenge due to outing as Spider-Man) has Alistair Smythe construct a Spider-Slayer as protection. When Peter's family breaks into Jonah's home looking for Peter's journal (given by the Green Goblin) Jonah, using the Spider-Slayer, attacks. Hitting Gwen Stacy just as Peter arrives, Jonah's Spider-Slayer is ripped to shreds by the hero.

What If 
After May Parker and John Jameson are killed in a space shuttle crash caused by the Chameleon, J. Jonah Jameson adopts Peter Parker, and blames the deaths of their loved ones on Spider-Man. Obsessed with taking Spider-Man down, Jameson commissions the creation of the Spider-Slayer and the Scorpion formula, the latter of which is ingested by Flash Thompson. The serum warps Flash's mind and causes Flash to go on a rampage, which ends when subdued by Spider-Man (who reveals being Peter Parker to Jameson) and the Spider-Slayer, controlled by Jameson. Jameson realizes how irrational his hatred of Spider-Man is, and decides to help his adopted son fight crime using the Spider-Slayer.

In other media

Television

 The Mark I Spider-Slayer appears in the Spider-Man (1967) episode "Captured by J. Jonah Jameson". This version was built by Henry Smythe and is equipped with two metallic tentacle-like arms.
 The Spider-Slayers appear in Spider-Man: The Animated Series. In its self-titled episode, Spencer Smythe, with help from Norman Osborn, builds a Spider-Slayer called the "Black Widow" to hunt down Spider-Man. However, it is destroyed after a battle with the hero at Spencer's lab, resulting in its creator's apparent death. In the episode "Return of the Spider-Slayers", Spencer's son Alistair joins the Kingpin, recreates the Black Widow, and builds the "Tarantula" and "Scorpion" Spider-Slayers, which are able to combine together. In the episode "Tablet of Time", Alistair creates the "Mega Slayer", a heavily armed android he can operate remotely. In the episode "The Ultimate Slayer", as punishment for his repeated failures, Kingpin's chief scientist Herbert Landon genetically mutates Alistair into the Ultimate Spider-Slayer, giving him organic laser guns growing from his shoulders in addition to superhuman strength and resilience. Alistair eventually breaks free from the Kingpin's control after Spider-Man helps him discover that Spencer is still alive and Kingpin placed him in cryogenic suspension. In the episode "The Wedding", the Kingpin uses a duplicate of the Mega Slayer to stop Goblin Glider-riding robots sent by Alistair and the Green Goblin from crashing Peter Parker and Mary Jane Watson's wedding, though it is destroyed while helping Spider-Man and Black Cat. The show was also supposed to feature the "Alien Spider Slayer", which was released as part of the series' tie-in toy line and also served as a boss in the series' video game adaptation, but was cut for unknown reasons.
 A Spider-Slayer like concept called the Sentinel Prowlers appear in Wolverine and the X-Men. The Sentinel Prowlers are a prototype version of the Sentinels.
 The Spider-Slayers appear in Ultimate Spider-Man. These versions are creations of HYDRA and Doctor Octopus, who combined Spider-Man's DNA with Arnim Zola's Synthezoids. The group consists of Kaine (voiced by Drake Bell), Scarlet Spider (voiced by Scott Porter), and the Delta-Nine Synthezoids: Bone Spider, Goliath Spider (both voiced by Imari Williams), and Ghost Spider (voiced by Roger Craig Smith). Kaine is an imperfect Synthezoid who is highly resistant to damage, can reattach lost limbs, and feed off Spider-Man or the other Spider-Slayers' life energy. Scarlet Spider, later named Ben Reilly by May Parker, is an almost perfect clone of Spider-Man barring a facial scar and powers. Bone Spider has claws and spikes all over his body; Goliath Spider is the strongest Spider-Slayer who can turn his body into metal; and Ghost Spider can teleport, become intangible, and generate bio-electricity. Scarlet Spider is introduced in the two-part episode "Hydra Attacks" and becomes an ally of Spider-Man and the Web Warriors before eventually being revealed as a spy for Doctor Octopus, though he soon redeems himself. In the three-part episode "The Spider-Slayers", Spider-Man encounters Kaine before he and Scarlet Spider stumble onto the other Spider-Slayers. As Doctor Octopus escapes, Zola reawakens and commands the Delta-Nine Synthezoids to attack the Web Warriors, but they eventually defeat them and free the Synthezoids from Zola's control. The Delta-Nine Synthezoids are taken to the Triskelion, but Kaine returns in a mutated, misshapen form to absorb the Delta-Nine Synthezoids and become the "Ultimate Spider-Slayer". Despite this, he is defeated by Agent Venom.
 The Spider-Slayers appear in Spider-Man (2017). These versions resemble spiders and come in human-sized, mecha-sized, and miniature variants. The original Spider-Slayers were created by Spencer Smythe, though Oscorp stole his schematics and created their own versions.

Video games
 The Spider-Slayers appears in Spider-Man (1995). In the SNES version, the Mark X and XIV Spider-Slayers appear as bosses, the Mark XVI and Mark XVII models appear as regular enemies, and the Mark XV is featured only in Spectacular mode. Additionally, the Mark X, XIV, XVI, and XVII Spider-Slayers return as enemies in the final level. The Mark X model also appears in a secret room in the sewers in Spectacular mode. In the Sega Genesis version, the Mark XV Spider-Slayer appears in the "Deconstruction Zone" level while the Mark X model is the boss of the "Mean Streets of the City" level.
 The Mark X and IX Spider-Slayers appear in The Amazing Spider-Man: Lethal Foes.
 The Spider-Slayers appear in The Amazing Spider-Man 3: Invasion of the Spider-Slayers.
 The Spider-Slayers appear in Spider-Man (2002). These versions are human-sized mechanical spiders previously known as "Hnter-Killers" created by Oscorp to hunt down Spider-Man.
 The Ultimate Marvel incarnation of the Spider-Slayers appear in Spider-Man: Shattered Dimensions. These versions are large androids armed with flamethrowers that were created by S.H.I.E.L.D. as a counter-measure to symbiotes.
 The Spider-Slayers appear in The Amazing Spider-Man (2012). These versions are called S-Bots and were created by Oscorp under the supervision of CEO Alistair Smythe as a countermeasure for the company's cross-species experiments. They consist of Sentries (which come in Medical, Combat, and Advanced Combat variants), Seekers (used to track down cross-species), and Hunters (arachnid-like flying robots called in by the Seekers to eliminate cross-species once they are found). There are also three special robots created specifically for citywide threats: S-01, a larger version of the Hunter that cannot fly, but can shoot lasers and homing missiles; S-02, a giant tentacled snake-like robot equipped with large drills that allow it to tunnel through buildings and underground; and S-03, a massive, heavily armed scorpion-like machine.
 The Hunters and Seekers return in The Amazing Spider-Man 2 (2014), in which they are used by the Enhanced Crime Task Force to hunt down Spider-Man if his hero reputation is too low.

See also
 Spencer Smythe
 Alistair Smythe

References

Characters created by Stan Lee
Characters created by Steve Ditko
Comics characters introduced in 1965
Marvel Comics robots
Spider-Man characters code names
Fictional robots
Spider-Man characters